Lieutenant Robert Miles Todd was an American World War I flying ace credited with five enemy planes destroyed.

Early life
Robert Miles Todd was born in Cincinnati, Ohio on 24 June 1897.

World War I
Todd joined the United States Air Service on 6 August 1917. He was studying engineering at the University of Cincinnati; however, he graduated from the Ohio State University School of Aeronautics in October. He then underwent aviation training at Benbrook Field, Texas before moving on to Canada for further training.

Todd served with the 17th Aero Squadron in France; the American squadron was under British control. Todd destroyed four enemy airplanes and an observation balloon during August 1918. On 26 August 1918, Todd and seven squadronmates were in a dogfight with 40 Fokkers of Germany's Jagdgeschwader 3. Immediately after Todd shot down his final victim on 26 August 1918, he fell under the guns of Rudolf Klimke of Jagdstaffel 27, one of seven Camels downed that day by the Germans. Todd was wounded, but survived, and was held captive as a prisoner of war until December 1918. German soldiers rescuing him from the overturned wreckage of his plane broke his foot, and he was abused by German housewives on the way to prison.

List of aerial victories
See also Aerial victory standards of World War I

Post World War I
After his return to the U. S., Todd once again took up engineering.

During World War II, Todd returned to military service; however, his eyesight was no longer acute enough for him to fly. He served in logistics for both the Eighth Air Force and the Ninth Air Force until 1944, commanding a 5,000 man air depot group.
He also served as a commander of a staging area for gliders. He stayed on after war's end to aid in the disposal of combat material, but quit in disgust when he found that serviceable goods that could have been converted to civilian use were instead being dumped.

Todd moved to San Diego in 1952. He retired from military service as a lieutenant colonel in 1965.

His autobiographical memoirs were published in 1978, entitled Sopwith Camel Fighter Ace.

In 1981, he was one of a group of aces who returned to France for an Armistice Day celebration.
In 1982, he belatedly received the Purple Heart for the wound he received on 26 August 1918.

Robert Miles Todd died of pneumonia in the Veterans Administration Hospital in La Jolla, California on 20 January 1988.

See also

 List of World War I flying aces from the United States

References

Bibliography
 Sopwith Camel Fighter Ace Robert M. Todd. AJAY Enterprises, 1978. , .
 Above the Trenches: A Complete Record of the Fighter Aces and Units of the British Empire Air Forces 1915–1920. Christopher F. Shores, Norman L. R. Franks, Russell Guest. Grub Street, 1990. , .
 Over the Front: A Complete Record of the Fighter Aces and Units of the United States and French Air Services, 1914–1918 Norman L. R. Franks, Frank W. Bailey. Grub Street, 1992. , .

External links

American World War I flying aces
1897 births
1988 deaths